Bertelli is an Italian surname. Notable people with the surname include:

Agostino Bertelli (1727-1776), talian painter, mainly painting landscapes
Augustus Cesare Bertelli  (1890–1979) known as Bert or Gus, Anglo-Italian car designer, racing driver and businessman
Achille Bertelli (1855–1925), Italian chemical industrial and aeronautical pioneer
Angelo Bertelli (1921–1999), American college football player
Cristofano Bertelli (fl. c. 1525), Italian engraver
Ferrando Bertelli (c. 1525–after 1572), Italian engraver of the Renaissance period
Francesco Bertelli (1794–1844), Italian astronomer
Luca Bertelli (fl. 1564–1589), Italian engraver
Luigi Bertelli (in art known as Vamba; 1858-1920), Italian author, illustrator and journalist
Maria Bertelli (born 1977), British professional volleyball player
Patrizio Bertelli (born 1946), chief executive officer (CEO) of Prada Group and husband to Miuccia Prada
Renato Bertelli (1900–1974), Italian Futurist artist
Vasco Giuseppe Bertelli (1924−2013), Italian Roman Catholic priest

See also
Berte (disambiguation) 
8266 Bertelli, main-belt asteroid

Italian-language surnames